The 2019–20 Scottish Championship (known as Ladbrokes Championship for sponsorship reasons) was the 25th season in the current format of 10 teams in the second-tier of Scottish football. Ten teams contested the league: Alloa Athletic, Arbroath, Ayr United, Dundee, Dundee United, Dunfermline Athletic, Greenock Morton, Inverness Caledonian Thistle, Partick Thistle and Queen of the South.

The season began on 3 August 2019 and was scheduled to end on 2 May 2020. On 13 March 2020 all SPFL leagues were indefinitely suspended due to the COVID-19 pandemic in Scotland. On 8 April 2020, the SPFL proposed to end the 2019–20 season by utilising a points per game ratio to determine the final standings. The plan was approved on 15 April 2020, declaring that the season was over, as Dundee United were declared title winners with Partick Thistle relegated to League One.  Partick Thistle joined Heart of Midlothian F.C. (which had been relegated from the Scottish Premiership under similar circumstances) in suing the Scottish Professional Football League on the grounds that their relegation was unfair; Partick was two points behind the second-to-last-place team but had played one less game.  Ultimately, the lawsuit failed and Partick and Hearts were indeed relegated.

Teams
The following teams have changed division since the 2018–19 season:

To Championship

Arbroath secured promotion to the Championship on 13 April 2019. Dundee were relegated from the Premiership on 4 May 2019.

From Championship

Ross County secured promotion to the Premiership on 26 April 2019. Falkirk were relegated to League One on 3 May 2019.

Stadia and locations

Personnel and kits

Managerial changes

League summary

League table

Results
Teams play each other four times, twice in the first half of the season (home and away) and twice in the second half of the season (home and away), making a total of 180 games, with each team playing 36.

First half of season (Matches 1–18)

Second half of season (Matches 19–36)

Season statistics

Scoring

Top scorers

Hat-tricks

Note

4  Player scored four goals

Attendances

Awards

Monthly awards

References

Scottish Championship seasons
2
2
Scot
Scotland